Forcepimenia is a genus of cavibelonian solenogasters, shell-less, worm-like marine mollusks. It contains a single species: Forcepimenia protecta Salvini-Plawen, 1969.

References

Cavibelonia